Viorel Domocoș (born 11 April 1975) is a Romanian former professional footballer who played as a midfielder.

References

External links
 

1975 births
Living people
People from Bihor County
Romanian footballers
Association football midfielders
Liga I players
FC Brașov (1936) players
FC U Craiova 1948 players
FC Dinamo București players
FC Progresul București players
FC Argeș Pitești players
Liga II players
FC Bihor Oradea players
FC Olimpia Satu Mare players
Chinese Super League players
Yunnan Hongta players
Chongqing Liangjiang Athletic F.C. players
Cypriot First Division players
Digenis Akritas Morphou FC players
Alki Larnaca FC players
Romanian expatriate footballers
Expatriate footballers in China
Romanian expatriate sportspeople in China
Expatriate footballers in Cyprus
Romanian expatriate sportspeople in Cyprus